Regiocrella is a genus of fungi in the family Clavicipitaceae.

References

Hypocreales genera
Clavicipitaceae
Taxa described in 2006